Geeta Tripathee (born 28 June 1972) is a Nepali poet, lyricist, essayist, literary critic and scholar. An eminent writer in Nepali, Geeta Tripathee has two volumes of poetry collection, one of lyrical poems and seven books in other literary genre to her credit. She also writes for newspapers on issues concerning women, environment and societal injustice.
 
Geeta Tripathee is the recipient of 'Padmakanya Gold Medal - 2000', conferred by the Government of Nepal. She received 'Best Lyricist Award' in 2008 from 'Sanskritik Sansthan', the major cultural adjunct of Nepal Government.

Early life 
Geeta Tripathee was born on June 28, 1972, in Kharelthok, Kavrepalanchok to an educator Bedraj Thapaliya and Ramadevi Thapaliya. She completed her high school education in Kharelthok in 1988, and moved to Kathmandu for further education. Tripathee joined Padma Kanya Multiple Campus in Kathmandu and graduated in 1993. She married Yadavraj Tripathee in 1989 while studying in Padmakanya college. Tripathee continued her study and completed her Master's degree in Nepali literature in 1998 with a gold medal by becoming the university topper. After completing her master's degree, she started teaching the subject of her interest and choice in different colleges under Tribhuvan University and Purbanchal University. Tripathee kept her writing carrier continued during her college days and afterwards. Later, she earned PhD in Nepali literature from Tribhuvan University in 2017.

Career 
Geeta Tripathee is a multi-genre writer. She has written two books of poetry, one book of lyrical poems, one book of essays and several books on literary criticism.

Geeta Tripathee's works are translated into other languages like English, Hindi, Japanese and Korean; and are published in notable literary journals abroad. Tripathee has taken part in numbers of national and international literary events as a poet, presenter and speaker. Tripathee participated in South Asian Literature Festivals organized by Foundation of SAARC Writers and Literature in New Delhi in 2010 and 2017 as Nepali delegate poet.

Works

Books
 Thunga Banfulka (2005)(Collection of lyrical poems)
 Dui Haraf Othharu (2008) (Collection of lyrical poems) (co-written with poet Manjul)
 Nrisamsha Parkhalharu (2009) (Collection of lyrical poems)
 Ma Eklo Ra Udaas Ustai (2014) (Collection of essays)
 Simal Ko Geet (2015) (Collection of lyrical poems)
 Drishtibicharan (2009) (Literary criticism)
 Kriti Bishleshan : Prayogik Aayam (2010) (Literary criticism)
 Bishwanari Nepali Sahitya : Parampara ra Prabriti (2015) (Literary criticism)
 Nepali Mahila Lekhan : Prabriti ra Yogdaan (2015) (Literary criticism)
 Nepali Niyatra : Siddhanta ra Prayog (2017) (Literary criticism)
 Paryawaran ra Narikendri Samalochana (2018) (Literary criticism)

Music Album
 Eklai… Eklai (2005)
 Saramsha (2009)

Awards 
 Padmakanya Gold Medal
 Best Lyricist Award

See also
List of Nepalese poets

References

External links 
 

1972 births
Living people
People from Kavrepalanchok District
People from Kathmandu
Nepali-language poets
Nepalese women poets
Nepalese lyricists
Lyric poets
Nepali-language writers
Nepalese songwriters
20th-century Nepalese poets
20th-century women writers
21st-century Nepalese poets
21st-century Nepalese women writers
Nepali-language lyricists
Nepalese women short story writers
Nepalese short story writers
Literary translators
Tribhuvan University alumni
Literary scholars
Women literary critics
Female critics of feminism
Nepalese literary critics
Shankar Lamichhane scholars
Padma Kanya Multiple Campus alumni